Olympiakos Laurium F.C. is a Greek football club, based in Laurium, Attica.

The club was founded in 1926. They will play in Football League 2 for the season 2013-14.

Association football clubs established in 1926
Football clubs in Attica
1926 establishments in Greece